Rigon is an Italian surname.

Geographical distribution
As of 2014, 51,3% of all known bearers of the surname Rigon were residents of Italy (frequency 1:10,938), 31,7% of Brazil (1:61,979), 9,07% of the Philippines (1:102,468), 3,76% of France (1:162,007), 0,86% of the United States (1:3,855,946), 0,85% of Australia (1:290,276), 0,53% of Canada (1:635,269), 0,29% of Germany (1:2,515,796), 0,23% of Argentina (1:1,709,737) and 0,19% of Spain (1:2,226,287).

Notable people
Charles Rigon (born 1996), Brazilian footballer
Davide Rigon (born 1986), Italian racing driver
Francesco Rigon (born 1987), Italian lightweight rower
Francis Rigon (born 1944), French racing cyclist
Marino Rigon (1925–2017), Italian-Bangladeshi missionary
Léon Rigon (born 1885), French equestrian
Shane Rigon (born 1977), Australian former rugby player
Stella Rigon (born 1989), Australian footballer

References

Italian-language surnames